Scopula nitidata  is a moth of the family Geometridae. It was first described by William Warren in 1905 and is found in South Africa.

References

Endemic moths of South Africa
Moths described in 1905
nitidata
Moths of Africa